INB Financial Corporation was an Indianapolis-based statewide bank holding company that was the largest Indiana-based financial institution at the time it was acquired by Michigan-based NBD Bancorp in 1992. Its primary subsidiary was the Indianapolis-based INB National Bank, formerly the Indiana National Bank, which can trace its origins to the founding of the Second State Bank of Indiana in 1834.

From the mid-1950s through the late 1980s, Indiana National Bank, American Fletcher National Bank, and Merchants National Bank, were the three largest banks in Indianapolis and its holding company, Indiana National (INB Financial) Corporation, along with American Fletcher Corporation and Merchants National Corporation, were the three largest bank holding companies in the state.

History
To allow it to acquire other banks and other financial related businesses, Indiana National Bank formed a holding company called Indiana National Corporation in 1969.

Expansion outside of Marion County

Until July 1, 1985, the state of Indiana did not permit bank branching across county lines nor bank ownership outside the bank holding company's home county. After that date, Indiana allowed very limited branching but allowed the purchase of banks by holding companies anywhere in the state as long as total deposits that were controlled by the holding company did not exceed a ceiling that was initially set at 11 percent of all deposits held in Indiana banks.

Indiana National Corporation made its first expansion move outside of Marion County by announcing in May 1985, two months before the new cross-county bank laws went into effect, the pending acquisitions of the Lafayette-based Lafayette National Bank, Delphi-based Union Bank & Trust Co., and Carmel-based Fidelity Bank of Indiana. The acquisition of Lafayette National Bank was completed in November 1985 for $29.8 million while the acquisition of Fidelity Bank was completed in December for $11.5 million and the acquisition of Union Bank was completed in December for $12.9 million.
 
In June 1985, Indiana National Corporation announced the pending acquisition of the Lowell-based Lowell National Bancorp with its Lowell National Bank subsidiary for $15.2 million. The acquisition was completed in November 1985 for $14.8 million.

In November 1985, Indiana National Corporation announced the acquisition of the deposits and the four branch offices of the failed Leo-based Allen County Bank & Trust Company from the Federal Deposit Insurance Corporation for $2 million. After the acquisition, Indiana National Bank had 45 branch offices in Marion County and 4 in Allen County.

In April 1986, Indiana National Corporation announced the pending acquisition of the Jeffersonville-based CommerceAmerica Corporation with its CommerceAmerica Banking Company of Jeffersonville and The Old Capital Bank & Trust Company of Corydon subsidiaries for $73.5 million in stock. The acquisition was completed in August 1986.

By late 1987, Indiana National wanted to expand into Monroe County, but was unable to find a local bank that it could purchase. Indiana bank branching law at that time did not allow the building of full branch offices beyond contiguous counties. To overcome that problem, Indiana National decided to purchase a small bank in Morgan County that would establish the desired branches in Monroe County before being absorbed. In January 1988, Indiana National Corporation announced the pending acquisition of the Mooresville-based Morgan County Bancorp with its Morgan County Bank & Trust Company subsidiary for $4 million. In November 1988, Indiana National Corporation announced that it planned to open three branch offices in Bloomington in early 1989. The new Bloomington offices were opened a few months later.

To aid the company in its long-term goal to expand out of state and to enable the company to have a unified brand identity, the company adopted the INB brand for all business units in April 1989. Prior to this point, acquired banks maintained their previous identity, many of which were well known in their communities. Indiana National Corporation was renamed INB Financial Corporation, Indiana National Bank became INB National Bank, Lafayette National Bank became INB National Bank, N.W., and CommerceAmerica became INB Banking Company.

In April 1989, the newly renamed INB Financial Corporation announced the pending acquisition of the Bedford-based Citizens Bancshares Corporation with its Citizens National Bank of Bedford subsidiary for $12.6 million. The acquisition was completed in September 1989.

In September 1989, INB Financial Corporation announced the pending acquisition of the Chesterton-based CSB Inc. with its Chesterton State Bank subsidiary for $18.2 million. The acquisition was completed in June 1990 and the acquired bank was renamed INB Banking Company North.

In February 1990, INB Financial Corporation announced the pending acquisition of the Evansville-based Peoples Savings Bank of Evansville for an undisclosed amount. The acquisition was completed in November 1990 and Peoples was renamed the INB Banking Company Southwest.

In June 1990, INB Financial Corporation announced the pending acquisition of the Columbia City-based FL&T Corporation with its Farmers Loan and Trust Company subsidiary for $12 million. The acquisition was completed in January 1991 and Farmers Loan and Trust was renamed the INB Banking Company, Northeast.

In August 1990, INB Financial Corporation announced the pending acquisition of the Salem-based Homestate Bancorp with its State Bank of Salem subsidiary for $6.1 million in cash. The acquisition was completed in March 1991.

NBD Indiana
In March 1992, Detroit, Michigan–based NBD Bancorp announced the pending acquisition of INB Financial Corporation, the largest Indiana-based bank holding company with its six subsidiary banks, including its flagship bank, Indiana National Bank, the largest Indiana-owned bank at the time of the announcement. NBD paid $876 million in stock and the acquisition was completed in October 1992. INB Financial was renamed NBD Indiana and all of the separate INB banks were merged into a single statewide NBD Bank that was headquartered in Indianapolis.

See also
 Thomas W. Binford

References

Banks based in Indiana
1992 mergers and acquisitions
Companies formerly listed on the Nasdaq
Defunct banks of the United States
Defunct companies based in Indianapolis